Marie Elizabeth may refer to -

People
Marie Elizabeth Kachel Bucher (1909-2008), teacher
Marie Elizabeth Levens, (b 1950) former Foreign Minister of Suriname
Marie-Elizabeth-Louise Vigee-Lebrun (1755-1842), French artist
Marie-Elizabeth of Valois (1752-1578), daughter of Charlex IX of France
Marie Elizabeth Zakrzewska (1829-1902), German born physician

Ships
, an Algerian owned, Panamanian flagged coaster in service 1975-76